Melini is a village in the Larnaca District of Cyprus, 4 km west of Ora. Its population in 2011 was 59.

References

Communities in Larnaca District